Morpho aurora, the Aurora morpho, is a Neotropical butterfly found in Bolivia and Peru.

M. aurora is similar to Morpho portis in the shape of the wings and the arrangement of the black distal spots. Upper surface with light blue, distally darkening gloss. Under surface grey white, with mother-of-pearl gloss, basal area purple. The ocelli show through distinctly above and are yellow in the middle with white crescents and sharply ringed with black. On the forewing four or five, on the hindwing always four eyespots, the apical one sometimes doubled, being accompanied anteriorly by a halved eyespot. The species flies rather high; Garlepp met with it at Cocapata in Bolivia at elevations of about 2600 m.

Etymology

Aurora is the goddess of dawn in Roman mythology.

Subspecies
 Morpho aurora aurora Westwood, 1851; occurs in Bolivia and Peru
 Morpho aurora aureola Fruhstorfer, 1913; occurs in Peru

References
Notes

Sources
Le Moult (E.) & Réal (P.), 1962-1963. Les Morpho d'Amérique .
Paul Smart, 1976 The Illustrated Encyclopedia of the Butterfly World in Color. London, Salamander: Encyclopedie des papillons. Lausanne, Elsevier Sequoia (French language edition)   page 233 fig.7ssp. aureola Fruhst. (Peru), fig. 8 ssp. aureola Fruhst., underside (Peru).

External links
Butterflies of America Photographs of type specimens
"Morpho Fabricius, 1807" at Markku Savela's Lepidoptera and Some Other Life Forms''
 Photograph of voucher. 
Fiebig Photographs

Morpho